The Château de Serrant is a Renaissance château situated in the Loire Valley, the private residence of the Prince of Merode. It is open to visitors.

History 
The Renaissance château is built on the foundations of a medieval fortress. From the 14th century, it was held by the Brie family. Charles de Brie was inspired to start modernisation early in the 16th century, but lack of funds meant the project was halted with only the North Tower completed. Ownershipthen changed hands several times before Guillaume de Bautru, a State Councillor, purchased the property in 1636. De Bautru restarted the construction that had been halted over a century earlier. By using Charles de Brie's original plans and the same russet schist and white tuffeau stone, de Bautru ensured that there was a continuity of design. The central halls, two wings and the South Tower were added, with Jules Hardouin Mansart completing the work of de Bautru by building the chapel.

In 1749, the estate was sold by the last surviving descendant of the de Bautru family to Antoine Walsh, a wealthy Nantes slave trader who came from a family of exiled Irish Jacobites. As well as redecorating the interior of the castle, the Walsh family built an English style park, pavilions and a monumental gate complete with the family crest.

de Merode de La Tremoille 
The château eventually passed out of the hands of the Walsh family in 1830 when Valentine Eugénie Joséphine Walsh de Serrant married the Duc de La Trémoïlle (1764–1839). La Trémoïlle assigned Luciene Magne the task of restoring the château and several features were added, including parapets and cornices. The La Trémoïlle family still owns the château, but in the 20th century it has been modernised with cellars and the introduction of electricity.

The current owners are the descendants of Jean Charles, Prince de Ligne de La Trémoïlle (1911–2005). His daughter is Princess of Merode by marriage and they are the parents of Prince Emmanuel de Merode.

The castle is notable for its library stocked with 12,000 books, the vaulted halls which originally held the kitchens and Napoleon's bedroom, which was never used by the Emperor as he stayed at the castle for only two hours.

Gallery

References

External links

Châteaux of the Loire Valley
Châteaux in Maine-et-Loire
Historic house museums in Pays de la Loire
Museums in Maine-et-Loire
Water castles in France